Wang Min (born February 16, 1990) is a Chinese rower. She was born in Changzhou. She competed in double sculls together with Zhu Weiwei at the 2012 Summer Olympics in London, where they placed fourth.

References

1990 births
Living people
Sportspeople from Changzhou
Olympic rowers of China
Rowers at the 2012 Summer Olympics
Rowers from Jiangsu
Asian Games medalists in rowing
Rowers at the 2014 Asian Games
Chinese female rowers
Asian Games gold medalists for China
Medalists at the 2014 Asian Games
21st-century Chinese women